Sergei Vladimirovich Tchepikov (born 30 January 1967) is a Russian politician and a former Soviet-Russian biathlete and cross-country skier who competed at six Winter Olympics, five in biathlon (1988, 1992, 1994, 2002 and 2006) and one in cross-country skiing (1998). His last Olympic performance was a silver medal in the 4 × 7.5 km relay at the 2006 Winter Olympics in Turin.

Tchepikov has two World Cup titles (1989/90, 1990/91). He has had 25 podium finishes, six in first place, thirteen in second, and has come third six times. In the Olympics, Tchepikov has two gold, three silver, and one bronze medals. In the World Championships he has won 14 medals, however only two gold medals.

Biathlon results
All results are sourced from the International Biathlon Union.

Olympic Games
6 medals (2 gold, 3 silver, 1 bronze)

*Pursuit was added as an event in 2002, with mass start being added in 2006.

World Championships
14 medals (2 gold, 9 silver, 3 bronze)

*During Olympic seasons competitions are only held for those events not included in the Olympic program.
**Team was removed as an event in 1998, and pursuit was added in 1997 with mass start being added in 1999 and the mixed relay in 2005.

Individual victories
7 victories (3 In, 4 Sp)

*Results are from UIPMB and IBU races which include the Biathlon World Cup, Biathlon World Championships and the Winter Olympic Games.

Cross-country skiing results
All results are sourced from the International Ski Federation (FIS).

Olympic Games

World Championships

World Cup

Season standings

Team podiums

 1 victory
 3 podiums

Politics
In 2016, he was elected to the State Duma running as a United Russia candidate.

References

External links
 
 

1967 births
Living people
People from Imeni Lazo District
Soviet male biathletes
Russian male biathletes
Russian male cross-country skiers
Biathletes at the 1988 Winter Olympics
Biathletes at the 1992 Winter Olympics
Biathletes at the 1994 Winter Olympics
Cross-country skiers at the 1998 Winter Olympics
Biathletes at the 2002 Winter Olympics
Biathletes at the 2006 Winter Olympics
Olympic biathletes of the Soviet Union
Olympic biathletes of the Unified Team
Olympic biathletes of Russia
Olympic cross-country skiers of Russia
Medalists at the 1988 Winter Olympics
Medalists at the 1992 Winter Olympics
Medalists at the 1994 Winter Olympics
Medalists at the 2006 Winter Olympics
Olympic medalists in biathlon
Olympic bronze medalists for the Soviet Union
Olympic silver medalists for Russia
Olympic gold medalists for the Soviet Union
Olympic gold medalists for Russia
Biathlon World Championships medalists
United Russia politicians
21st-century Russian politicians
Soviet male cross-country skiers
Russian sportsperson-politicians
Seventh convocation members of the State Duma (Russian Federation)
Eighth convocation members of the State Duma (Russian Federation)